General McLeod may refer to:

Donald Kenneth McLeod (1885–1958), British Indian Army lieutenant general
John Macleod (British Army officer) (1752–1833), British Army lieutenant general
John Chetham McLeod (1831–1914), British Army lieutenant general
Roderick McLeod (British Army officer) (1905–1980), British Army lieutenant general